Gabhana is a tehsil, block, town and a Nagar panchayat in Aligarh district, 23 km from district headquarters in the state of Uttar Pradesh, India.

Geography
Gabhana is situated on the Grand Trunk Road at a distance of 100  km  in the southeast of New Delhi and 80 km from Noida and Ghaziabad, Uttar Pradesh. Neighbouring Cities are Khair and Khurja. It is near to Harduaganj Thermal Power Station, one of the oldest hydroelectric power plants of India. The village is notable for Fort Gabanha, a sandstone palace recently renovated quite drastically by the current occupant.

Demographics
As of 2011 Indian Census, Gabhana had a total population of 5,886, of which 3,096 were males and 2,790 were females. Population within the age group of 0 to 6 years was 843. The total number of literates in Gabhana was 3,617, which constituted 61.5% of the population with male literacy of 70.3% and female literacy of 51.6%. The effective literacy rate of 7+ population of Gabhana was 71.7%, of which male literacy rate was 81.9% and female literacy rate was 60.4%. The Scheduled Castes and Scheduled Tribes population was 1,875 and 6 respectively. Gabhana had 993 households in 2011.

Transport
Gabhana has a bus stand and a railway station, Somna Railway Station. National Highway NH91 (also known as Gabhana bypass) passes through the town of Gabhana. NH91 Toll Plaza is situated at Somna.

References 

Cities and towns in Aligarh district
Villages in Aligarh district